The 2019 NWSL College Draft was the seventh annual meeting of National Women's Soccer League (NWSL) franchises to select newly eligible college players for the 2019 NWSL season. It was held on January 10, 2019 in conjunction with the United Soccer Coaches Convention in Chicago, Illinois.

Format
Draft order was determined by the final 2018 regular season standings.
 Final list of registered players was released on January 9, 2019.

Results

Key

Picks

Notable undrafted players
Below is a list of undrafted rookies who appeared in a competitive NWSL game in 2019.

Trades 
Round 1:

Round 2:

Round 3:

Round 4:

Summary
In 2019, a total of 26 colleges had players selected. Of these, five had a player drafted to the NWSL for the first time: Baylor, Butler, Loyola–Chicago, Northwestern and Oregon.

Schools with multiple draft selections

Selections by college athletic conference

Selections by position

See also
 List of NWSL drafts
 List of National Women's Soccer League draftees by college team
 2018 National Women's Soccer League season

References

External links

 2019 NWSL College Draft on YouTube
 Official 2019 NWSL College Draft Results
 Official list of registered players

National Women's Soccer League drafts
College Draft
NWSL College Draft
2010s in Chicago
Soccer in Chicago
Events in Chicago
NWSL College Draft